= Ahmed Souaiaia =

American academic

Ahmed Souaiaia is a professor at the University of Iowa with joint appointments in the Department of Religious Studies, International Studies, and College of Law. His research and teaching focus on women in Islam, human rights law, religion and politics, religion in the public sphere, political dissent in Islam, women in Islamic law, Islamic political theory, and modern Islamic thought.

== Works ==
Souaiaia is the author of several books. He has published numerous articles in refereed journals including the Journal of Law and Religion, Muslim World Journal, Journal of Women in the Middle East and the Islamic World, and Muslim World Journal of Human Rights. His commentaries and columns appeared in Asia Times, Eurasia Review, Monthly Review, The Open Democracy Foundation for the Advancement of Global Education, Foreign Policy In Focus, and other regional and international media. He is also the founder and managing editor of Mathal (a Journal of Islamic and Middle Eastern Multidisciplinary Studies).

== Books ==
- Souaiaia, Ahmed E. Muslims and the Western Conception of Rights. Routledge, 2021.
- Souaiaia, Ahmed E. Anatomy of Dissent in Islamic Societies: Ibadism, Rebellion, and Legitimacy. New York, NY: Palgrave Macmillan, 2013.
- Souaiaia, Ahmed E. Contesting Justice Women, Islam, Law, and Society. Albany: State University of New York Press, 2008. In 646 libraries according to WorldCat
